The Molson Indy Montreal was an annual auto race in Montreal, Quebec on the Champ Car World Series calendar.

History
Originally known as the Molson Indy 300, it was first held at Sanair Super Speedway, an oval track, from 1984 through 1986. The Champ Car series revived the race in 2002, and it was held in late August each year until 2006 at the Circuit Gilles Villeneuve, a permanent road course most famous as the home of the Formula One Canadian Grand Prix.

In 2006, the name of the race was changed to the Grand Prix of Montreal after its sale by Molson Sports & Entertainment. This mirrored the name change of the Toronto Champ Car race from the Molson Indy Toronto to the Molson Grand Prix of Toronto after its sale by Molson.

Future prospects
After the 2006 race, the future of the Grand Prix of Montreal became shrouded in doubt. The Circuit Gilles Villeneuve is allowed to be used for one race weekend outside of the Canadian Grand Prix, and it was heavily speculated that from 2007 onwards, Canadian Grand Prix promoter Normand Legault (who promotes all races at CGV) would replace the Grand Prix of Montreal with a NASCAR Busch Series race. Champ Car announced in September 2006 that it would indeed not be returning to Circuit Gilles Villeneuve and would be replacing the event with one at Circuit Mont-Tremblant (2007 Mont-Tremblant Champ Car Grand Prix, previously held 1968-1970). Circuit Gilles-Villeneuve replaced the race with the NASCAR NAPA Auto Parts 200 race.

Race Winners

Sanair (1984–1986)

Circuit Gilles Villeneuve (2002–2006)

Formula Atlantic winners
These races were held at Circuit Gilles Villeneuve.

Attendance

See also
Molson Indy Toronto
Molson Indy Vancouver
List of Indycar races

References

External links
Champ Car Stats: Sanair archive, Montreal archive
Ultimate Racing History: Sanair archive, Montreal archive

 
Auto races in Canada